Snelgrove may refer to:

Anne Snelgrove (born 1957), British Labour politician, Member of Parliament for Swindon South since 2005
Donald Snelgrove, the Suffragan Bishop of Hull from 1981 until 1994
Edwin Snelgrove, serial killer currently serving a 60-year sentence for the murder of Carmen Rodriguez
Lloyd Snelgrove, Canadian politician, who currently represents the electoral district of Vermilion-Lloydminster in Alberta
Ralph Snelgrove (1914–1990), Canadian radio and television pioneer who built television station CKVR-TV in Barrie, Ontario
Timothy Snelgrove, the founder of Timothy's World Coffee
Victoria Snelgrove (1982–2004), college student who was accidentally killed by Boston police

See also
Snelgrove, Ontario, community in Brampton, Ontario, Canada, between Brampton and Caledon, centred on Hurontario Street
Snelgrove's Ice Cream began as a family-owned company in Salt Lake City founded in 1929 by Charles Rich Snelgrove (1887–1976)
Snellgrove